Amanda Black is a Northern Irish epidemiologist who is the associate director of biological resources in the National Cancer Institute's division of cancer epidemiology and genetics.

Life 
Black received a undergraduate degree in biomedical science (2001), Master of Medical Laboratory Science (2002), and Ph.D. in epidemiology and public health (2005) from Queen's University Belfast's faculty of medicine and health sciences. Her dissertation was titled Secular trends in the physical health and psychological well-being of students attending Queen's University Belfast. Her dissertation was supervised by Peter McCarron, Liam Murray, and Michael Donnelly of the department of epidemiology and public health. In 2006, Black was selected for a National Cancer Institute (NCI) cancer prevention fellowship. During her fellowship, Black was awarded a Master of Public Health (2008) by the University of Manchester. Black's fellowship was in the NCI early detection research group, where she worked on the prostate, lung, colorectal and ovarian cancer screening trial (PLCO).

In 2009, Black joined division of cancer epidemiology and genetics (DCEG) as a staff scientist. She is associate director of biological resources. In the NCI office of the director, Black oversees management of the biological specimen resources of the DCEG and supports the planning of new prospective multi-center cohort studies. She is a member of the PLCO leadership team.

References 

Living people
Year of birth missing (living people)
Place of birth missing (living people)
21st-century scientists from Northern Ireland
21st-century British women scientists
Northern Ireland emigrants to the United States
Alumni of Queen's University Belfast
Alumni of the University of Manchester
National Institutes of Health people
Cancer epidemiologists
Women epidemiologists
Epidemiologists from Northern Ireland